The fourth round of the women's team pursuit of the 2010–2011 UCI Track Cycling World Cup Classics took place in Manchester, United Kingdom on 18 February 2011. 22 teams participated in the contest.

Competition format
The women's team pursuit race consists of a 3 km race between two teams of three cyclists, starting on opposite sides of the track.  If one team catches the other, the race is over.

The tournament consisted of an initial qualifying round.  The top two teams in the qualifying round advanced to the gold medal match and the third and fourth teams advanced to the bronze medal race.

Schedule
Friday 18 February
11:25-13:35 Qualifying
19:52-20:06 Finals
20:48-20:56 Victory Ceremony

Schedule from Tissottiming.com

Results

Qualifying

Results from Tissottiming.com.

Finals

Final bronze medal race

Final gold medal race

Results from Tissottiming.com.

References

2011 in British sport
Women's team pursuit (track cycling)
2010–11 UCI Track Cycling World Cup Classics